Nikolai Dmitryevich Vekov (November 26, 1870  — 1930s) was a Russian  opera and operetta artist (baritone) and director. He was one of the most popular artists of his time.

Biography
From the family priest. In 1892 he graduated from the Orenburg Teacher's Institute. In 1894-1897 he sang in the Moscow Synodal Choir. In 1895-1901, he studied singing at the Moscow Conservatory (teachers   Camille Everardi and Yelizaveta Lavrovskaya). Since 1900, he performed in the troupe of the Association of Moscow Private Russian Opera. In 1901, after graduating from the Moscow Conservatory with a small silver medal, he first continued to work there, until 1904, simultaneously with 1903 speaking in concerts of the Mug of Russian music lovers with the performance of romances, and then (1904-1911) he entered the Zimin Opera. Worked on provincial scenes. He was a director at the Sofia Folk Opera, later taught.

Worked on provincial scenes. He was a director at the Sofia Folk Opera, later taught.

Centuries worked in the movies. Among his roles — The Duel in  story of Kuprin, Miroslav in  Martha-Posadnitsa  and  boyar Nagoy in The Death of Ivan the Terrible, where he debuted Yakov Protazanov.

References

External links

 Коллекция открыток с изображением Векова   в различных ролях

1870 births
1930s deaths
People from Ryazan
19th-century male opera singers from the Russian Empire
Russian operatic baritones
Russian music educators
Moscow Conservatory alumni